Tihomir Dimitrov (Bulgarian: Тихомир Димитров; born 4 February 2000) is a Bulgarian footballer who plays as a centre back for Ludogorets Razgrad.

Career
Dimitrov completed his league debut for Ludogorets Razgrad on 26 May 2021 in a match against CSKA 1948. On 6 June 2022 Budinov was sent on loan to the newly promoted First League team Spartak Varna until the end of the season. But on 23 July 2022 his loan was ended without playing a single official game.

International career
On 18 May 2021 he received his first call up for the Bulgaria U21 team, for the friendly matches against Russia U21 and Albania U21 on 3 and 6 June.

Career statistics

Club

References

External links
 

2000 births
Living people
Bulgarian footballers
Bulgaria youth international footballers
PFC Ludogorets Razgrad II players
PFC Ludogorets Razgrad players
First Professional Football League (Bulgaria) players
Second Professional Football League (Bulgaria) players
Association football defenders